Reni Eddo-Lodge  (born 25 September 1989) is a British journalist and author, whose writing primarily focuses on feminism and exposing structural racism. She has written for a range of publications, including The New York Times, The Guardian, The Independent, The Daily Telegraph, The Voice, BuzzFeed, Vice, i-D and Dazed & Confused, and is a contributor to the 2019 anthology New Daughters of Africa, edited by Margaret Busby.

In June 2020, following the George Floyd protests, her book Why I'm No Longer Talking to White People About Race (published in 2017) rose 155 places to top the UK non-fiction paperback chart, at the same time as Bernardine Evaristo's 2019 novel Girl, Woman, Other topped the paperback fiction chart, the first time books by black British women headed both charts. On 16 June 2020 she became the first black British woman to be No. 1 overall in the British book charts.

Early life and education
Eddo-Lodge was born and raised in London, England, by a Nigerian mother. She attended St Anne's Catholic High School in Enfield.

She studied English literature at University of Central Lancashire, graduating in 2011. While at university, she became involved in feminist activism and the 2010 student protest movement. She was president of the University of Central Lancashire students' union until 2012, and was an elected member of the National Executive Council of the National Union of Students from 2012 to 2013.

Career
As a freelance journalist, Eddo-Lodge has written for a number of publications, including The New York Times, The Guardian, The Independent, The Daily Telegraph, The Voice, BuzzFeed, Vice, i-D and Dazed & Confused.

In December 2013, Eddo-Lodge appeared on BBC Radio 4's Woman's Hour to discuss the year in feminism alongside activist Caroline Criado Perez. During a discussion on intersectionality, Criado Perez seemed to imply that Eddo-Lodge was involved in online abuse of other feminists. Although Criado Perez apologised for the way her comments could have been interpreted, former Conservative MP Louise Mensch accused Eddo-Lodge of "bullying". 

Eddo-Lodge has also appeared on BBC Radio 3’s Night Waves, discussing feminist issues. In April 2014, she was a judge in the BBC Woman's Hour Power List 2014. In  July 2020, Lodge partnered with Emma Watson and the WOW Foundation to spearhead a project reimagining the London Underground Map, renaming the 270 stops to spotlight women and non-binary people who have shaped the city's history. The initiative will consult writers, museums, and librarians and is set to be published by Haymarket Books on International Women's Day 2022.

Why I'm No Longer Talking to White People About Race 
In 2017, Eddo-Lodge completed her debut book, Why I’m No Longer Talking to White People About Race; released by Bloomsbury Publishing, the polemic was made available in bookshops and online in June 2017. Initial reviews were positive, with 2015 Booker Prize-winner Marlon James writing that it was "essential" and "begging to be written". Others such as Trevor Phillips in The Sunday Times took issue with the book, with Phillips claiming that it probed "delicately knotted issues with all the subtlety of a blunderbuss". The book won the Jhalak Prize in March 2018.

Eddo-Lodge teamed up with podcast producer Renay Richardson to create About Race with Reni Eddo-Lodge, which premiered in March 2018 and has been named one of the best podcasts of 2018 by British GQ and Wired. Seen as a complement to the book, the podcast examined Britain's modern relationship with race.

In January 2018, Eddo-Lodge was chosen as one of seven prominent British women to be photographed for British Vogue, to mark the centenary of British women winning the right to vote. In the 2020 and 2021 editions of the Powerlist, Eddo-Lodge was listed in the Top 100 of the most influential people in the UK of African/African-Caribbean descent.

Impact during the Black Lives Matter protests
In June 2020, Eddo-Lodge's book Why I’m No Longer Talking to White People About Race rose 155 places in the official Bookseller chart. The upsurge in sales took place in the wake of the murder of George Floyd and subsequent global Black Lives Matter protests. This meant that she became the first black British woman to top the non-fiction book-selling charts at number 1; the fiction chart was simultaneously topped by the novelist Bernardine Evaristo. Eddo-Lodge stated that she was "dismayed by ... the tragic circumstances in which this achievement came about". On 16 June 2020, Eddo-Lodge became the first black British woman to be No. 1 overall in the British book charts.

Awards and recognition

Criticism
In an interview published by The Spectator in October 2020 entitled "Kemi Badenoch: The problem with critical race theory", Badenoch, the Equalities Minister, accused authors such as Eddo-Lodge and Robin DiAngelo, whose book sales surged in the aftermath of the murder of George Floyd, of using critical race theory to segregate society.

More than 100 leading black writers, including Bernardine Evaristo, Malorie Blackman and Benjamin Zephaniah have condemned the comments of Badenoch, not just for the content of her remarks, but also accusing Badenoch of endangering the personal safety of anti-racist writers by singling them out. Eddo-Lodge demanded a correction and apology from The Spectator, who refused but offered her a column to reply; her complaint is currently lodged with IPSO. The Independent also ran the same story and have since printed a correction at the request of Eddo-Lodge. Neither had been in touch with Eddo-Lodge before printing the articles.

References

External links
 Reni Eddo-Lodge website
 

Living people
Black British women writers
English women journalists
The Guardian journalists
21st-century British women writers
English feminist writers
Alumni of the University of Central Lancashire
1989 births
Black British history
Fellows of the Royal Society of Literature
British people of Yoruba descent